MsQuic is a free and open source implementation of the IETF QUIC protocol written in C that is officially supported on the Microsoft Windows (including Server), Linux, and Xbox platforms. The project also provides libraries for macOS and Android, which are unsupported. It is designed to be a cross-platform general purpose QUIC library optimized for client and server applications benefitting from maximal throughput and minimal latency. By the end of 2021 the codebase had over 200,000 lines of production code, with 50,000 lines of "core" code, sharable across platforms. The source code is licensed under MIT License and available on GitHub.

Among its features are, in part, support for asynchronous IO, receive-side scaling (RSS), UDP send and receive coalescing, and connection migrations that persist connections between client and server to overcome client IP or port changes, such as when moving throughout mobile networks.

Both the HTTP/3 and SMB stacks of Microsoft Windows leverage MsQuic, with msquic.sys providing kernel-mode functionality. Being dependent upon Schannel for TLS 1.3, kernel mode therefore does not support 0-RTT.

User-mode programs can implement MsQuic, with support 0-RTT, through msquic.dll, which can be built from source code or downloaded as a shared library through binary releases on the repository.

Its support for the Microsoft Game Development Kit makes MsQuic possible on both Xbox and Windows.

See also

Transmission Control Protocol
User Datagram Protocol
HTTP/2
XDP for Windows

References

External links
 
 MsQuic Performance Dashboard (Interactive)
 MsQuic is Open Source
 Making MsQuic Blazing Fast
 Deploying HTTP/3 on Windows Server at Scale

C (programming language) libraries
Computer networking
Free and open-source software
Microsoft free software
Software using the MIT license
2019 software